The 2002 CAF Super Cup was the tenth CAF Super Cup, an annual football match in Africa organized by the Confederation of African Football (CAF), between the winners of the previous season's two CAF club competitions, the African Cup of Champions Clubs and the African Cup Winners' Cup.

The match took place on 15 March 2002, on Cairo Stadium in Cairo, Egypt, between Al Ahly, the 2001 CAF Champions League winner, and Kaizer Chiefs, the 2001 African Cup Winners' Cup winner.
Al-Ahly won the match 4–1 to get his first title.

Teams

Match details

References
 Al-Ahly Kaizer Chiefs

2002
2002 in African football
Al Ahly SC matches
Kaizer Chiefs F.C. matches
March 2002 sports events in Africa